Te la dedico is a Colombian telenovela created by Juan Andrés Granados for RCN Televisión. It aired on Canal RCN from 8 February 2022 to 15 July 2022. The series stars Pipe Bueno and Diana Hoyos as Wilson Barrera and Adriana Osorio, musicians who dream of becoming big music stars.

Plot 
Since they were young, Wilson (Pipe Bueno) and Adriana (Diana Hoyos) have had the illusion of being great artists, but different circumstances have kept them away from their dreams. Wilson, who comes from a humble family, is told by his mother to not be a dreamer, since the world of stage was not for them. Meanwhile, Rosa (Marcela Gallego), Adriana's mother, belittles her daughter's talent, and criticizes her for wanting to dedicate herself to music, going as far as kicking Adriana out of her home, so that she can continue to pursue her dreams far away from her. With these bumps in the road, Wilson and Adriana will cling to any opportunity that comes their way. Henry (Andrés Suárez) and La Mona (Valerie Domínguez) will come into their lives, to open the doors of a world unknown to them until now.

Cast 
 Pipe Bueno as Wilson Barrera
 Diana Hoyos as Adriana Osorio
 Luna Baxter as Claudia Silva
 Andrés Suárez as Henry Bedoya
 Valerie Domínguez as Zuly Robayo "La Mona"
 César Mora as Libardo Piñeres
 Juliana Velásquez as Manuela Cabrales
 Laura Junco as Mónica
 Rafael Zea as Bernardo
 Juan Pablo Barragán as Javier
 Marcela Gallego as Rosa
 Álvaro Bayona as Alfredo
 Paola Moreno as Luisa
 Caterin Escobar as La Chirris
 Juanita Molina as Brenda

Production 
The series was announced on 2 December 2021 as part of RCN Televisión's programming for 2022. Filming began on 14 December 2021 and concluded on 30 April 2022.

Ratings

Episodes

Special

Music

Volume 1 

The first soundtrack of the telenovela was released on 28 January 2022.

Volume 2 

The second soundtrack of the telenovela was released on 28 January 2022.

References

External links 
 

2022 telenovelas
2022 Colombian television series debuts
2022 Colombian television series endings
Colombian telenovelas
RCN Televisión telenovelas
Spanish-language telenovelas